"Runaway Daydreamer" is a song by the English recording artist Sophie Ellis-Bextor for her fifth studio album Wanderlust (2014). The song was released on 31 March 2014 as the second single of the album. Composed by Ed Harcourt with additional writing by Ellis-Bextor, it is a chamber pop track which features percussion and string instruments. Its lyrics, written in a way resemblant of nursery rhymes, expound on escapism and "self discovery".

"Runaway Daydreamer" received mostly positive reviews from music critics, who praised Ellis-Bextor's vocals and its sound; some denoted it as a highlight of Wanderlust. The song was promoted with a music video directed by Sophie Muller, which largely shows Ellis-Bextor in a lounge room and walking through an abandoned pier. It was also performed on programmes including ITV's Loose Women, and peaked at number 29 on the UK Indie chart. The song was featured on the regular and OW Version of the Theme Park Playlist.

Composition and reception

"Runaway Daydreamer", as with the rest of Wanderlust, was co-written by its producer Ed Harcourt along with Ellis-Bextor.  It was recorded at the State of the Ark studios, mixed and engineered by Richard Woodcruft, and mastered by Miles Showell. It is a chamber pop track which includes string arrangements and "shuffled percussion". Clare Considine of Time Out compared its sonority to that of a Humphrey Bogart movie soundtrack. AllMusic's Stephen Thomas Erlewine described the track as a "girl group homage". Davidf Farrell of PopMatters opined that the song and "Until the Stars Collide" set a "soaring, dreamy" atmosphere for Wanderlust. According to the sheet music published by Music Sales Group, the song contains 116 beats per minute in crotchet. Its introduction follows a chord progression of C—F/C—C—F/C—C—F/C—C—F, and transitions into the verse section in which the notes C–F–C are followed. The track is composed in the traditional verse–chorus form. Ellis-Bextor's vocals during the song incorporate the melisma technique and span from G to E.

The song's lyrics, which discuss escapism, are constructed in a way resemblant of nursery rhymes. During the chorus, Ellis-Bextor sings "It's just my imagination / Running away / Girl's gotta have a little daydream / It's a secret escape / It's just my imagination / Running away / Don't worry baby, I'm here to stay". Considine highlighted "I could tie up the bed sheets and slide down the house / Be gone before the morning comes" as lyrics exemplificative of Ellis-Bextor's "artistic freedom" in Wanderlust. Reviewing the song for Loud and Quiet, Stuart Stubbs wrote that it "sees our protagonist pull herself out of squalor and onto a road of self discovery." The song concludes with a short outro where Ellis-Bextor repeats the line "Don't worry baby, I'm here to stay" twice.

On behalf of Virgin Media, Matthew Horton opined that "Runaway Daydreamer" was the standout of Wanderlust, describing Ellis-Bextor's vocals in it as "prim and gorgeous". James Fyfe of The 405 echoed his view, praising Ellis-Bextor's vocal performance, as well as highlighting its sonority, despite observing it was not "musically adventurous". Writing for Digital Spy, Robert Copsey billed the song as beautiful and "shimmering". Thomas Erlewine highlighted the song as a standout, commenting that the album was "at its best when it's slightly dexterous", citing the song as an example. The Irish Times Louise Bruton wrote that the song explores "twee danger zones" and called it a "blunder".

Release and promotion
A promotional CD single including "Runaway Daydreamer"'s radio edit, with a length of 3 minutes and 27 seconds, was sent to radio stations in March 2014. The song was released in the United Kingdom on 23 March 2014. The music video for "Runaway Daydreamer" was directed by Sophie Muller, and released on 8 March 2014; it was mostly filmed during the taping of the video for "Young Blood"—Wanderlusts previous single. Ellis-Bextor lip-synchs the song's lyrics inside a lounge room, wearing a white lace dress, with her hair gathered into a ponytail; she is also seen walking through an abandoned pier, dining at a restaurant and posing in front of a small white house. The visual's aspect ratio is changed throughout, ranging from windowbox to letterbox. Ellis-Bextor performed the song in an acoustic setting, on the morning programme ZDF Morgenmagazin, aired on 23 January 2014 on German channel ZDF. On 17 March of that year, she sang it on ITV's Loose Women. The song charted on the UK Indie Singles at number 29.

Track listing
Promotional CD single
Details adapted from the credits of the CD single of "Runaway Daydeamer".
 "Runaway Daydreamer" (Radio edit) – 3:27

Credits and personnel
Credits adapted from the liner notes of Wanderlust.
 Sophie Ellis-Bextor – lead vocals, songwriting
 Ed Harcourt – songwriting, production, background vocals, samples, synth, keyboards, piano
 Gita Langley – violin
 Richard Woodcraft – engineering, mixing
 Miles Showell – mastering

Weekly charts

Release history

References

2014 songs
Songs written by Ed Harcourt
Songs written by Sophie Ellis-Bextor
Sophie Ellis-Bextor songs